The Appalachia Nunataks are a group of nunataks rising to about  on the west side of the Elgar Uplands, Alexander Island, Antarctica. They are situated 5.62 km southwest of Lyubimets Nunatak, 9 km southwest of Kozhuh Peak and 9.65 km north of Atanasov Ridge, and surmount Nichols Snowfield to the west. The feature was named by the United Kingdom Antarctic Place-Names Committee in 1977 after Appalachia, the 1902 Frederick Delius composition, in association with Delius Glacier and the names of composers in this area.

References
 

Nunataks of Alexander Island